The Wikimedia Foundation has been involved in several lawsuits. They have won some and lost several others.

This listing is not meant to be exhaustive, and only includes notable cases.

Outcomes in favor of the plaintiffs
In May 2011, Louis Bacon, a hedge fund manager, obtained a court order in Great Britain, where he owned property, against the Wikimedia Foundation, the Denver Post and WordPress to compel them to reveal the identity of persons who he claimed had anonymously defamed him on Wikipedia and the other two websites. However, legal experts said that the order was probably unenforceable in the United States.

Initially, the Foundation agreed to give the information to Bacon's solicitors, but later asserted that it would cooperate only with a court order in the U.S. It said, "we do not comply with foreign subpoenas absent an immediate threat to life or limb." Automattic, which owns WordPress, said Bacon would need a court order but agreed to remove any defamatory material from its websites.

In January 2019, a court in Germany ruled against the Wikimedia Foundation, prompting it to remove part of the history and the allegedly defamatory content about a professor. The Wikipedia article's content was ruled defamatory because the link supporting its claims was no longer active, a phenomenon known as "link rot."

Outcomes in favor of the Wikimedia Foundation
Barbara Bauer, a literary agent, sued the Wikimedia Foundation for defamation.  She claimed that a Wikipedia entry branded her the "dumbest" literary agent.  The case was dismissed because of the Communications Decency Act.

Professional golfer Fuzzy Zoeller, who felt that he was defamed on Wikipedia, said that he did not sue Wikipedia because he was told that his suit would not prevail, in light of the Communications Decency Act. He sued the Miami firm from whose computers the edits were made, but later dropped the case.

In 2007, three French nationals sued the Wikimedia Foundation when an article on Wikipedia described them as gay activists.  A French court dismissed the defamation and privacy case, ruling that the Foundation was not legally responsible for information in Wikipedia articles.  The judge ruled that a 2004 French law limited the Foundation's liability, and found that the content had already been removed.  He found that the Foundation was not legally required to check the information on Wikipedia, and that "Web site hosts cannot be liable under civil law because of information stored on them if they do not in fact know of their illicit nature."  He did not rule whether the information was defamatory.

Sylvia Scott Gibson, author of Latawnya, the Naughty Horse, Learns to Say "No" to Drugs, sued Wikipedia as she took issue with how editors had described her book. Her suit was dismissed.

Other alleged defamation
John Seigenthaler, an American writer and journalist, contacted Wikipedia in 2005 after his article was edited to incorrectly state that he had been thought for a brief time to be involved in the assassinations of John F. Kennedy and Bobby Kennedy. The content was present in the article for four months. Seigenthaler called Wikipedia a "flawed and irresponsible research tool," and criticized the protection the Communications Decency Act provided to Wikipedia.

The representative for the American Academy of Financial Management, George Mentz, suggested that either phony or incompetent Wikipedia editors were creating legal problems for Wikimedia in May 2013, because of alleged intentional false claims that had been published on Wikipedia.

In 2014, Yank Barry filed a defamation lawsuit against four Wikipedia editors. He withdrew it after about a month.

Sorin Cerin sued the admins of Romanian Wikipedia in Romanian courts, claiming "patent falsities". The trial ended in 2021; the plaintiff lost the case.

DMCA takedown notices

Texas Instruments sent a DMCA takedown notice to the Wikimedia Foundation because certain cryptographic keys were made public in an article on the Texas Instruments signing key controversy. A Wikipedia editor later filed a counter-notice. Because Texas Instruments did not reply in 10–14 business days as required by the DMCA, the keys were restored to the article.

Two other articles also came under the purview of Wikipedia's office actions because of the DMCA: Damon Dash and Peripheral Component Interconnect.

FBI seal controversy
In July 2010, the FBI sent a letter to the Wikimedia Foundation demanding that it cease and desist from using its seal on Wikipedia. The FBI claimed that such practice was illegal and threatened to sue.

In reply, Wikimedia counsel Michael Godwin sent a letter to the FBI claiming that Wikipedia was not in the wrong when it displayed the FBI seal on its website. He defended Wikipedia's actions and also refused to remove the seal.

NSA lawsuit

In March 2015, the Wikimedia Foundation, along with other groups, sued the National Security Agency over its upstream mass surveillance program.

Wikimedia Foundation, Inc. v. WordLogic Corporation et al 
Wikimedia Foundation, Inc. v. WordLogic Corporation et al was a lawsuit involving the Wikimedia Foundation as plaintiff and the companies WordLogic Corporation and 602531 British Columbia, Ltd. as defendants over a patent dispute.
Wikimedia denies those claims and has moved under  for a declaratory judgment against the WordLogic entities requesting a declaration from the Court that a number of patents property of defendants are invalid, and that Wikimedia Foundation does not infringe those patents "directly or indirectly, either literally or under the doctrine of equivalents" as provided by the Title 35 of the United States Code. The case was filed on March 11, 2020, before the United States District Court for the Northern District of California. On July 18, 2020, Wikimedia Foundation, Inc. moved to dismiss with prejudice its own complaint.

Richard Desmond in legal battle over term 'pornographer'
Richard Desmond is the former owner of Asian Babes and Readers' Wives. In November 2021, The Guardian reported that he has hired lawyers to force Wikipedia to remove the word "pornographer" from his biographical page. Desmond has argued that he cannot factually be described as a pornographer because that term applies only to individuals who publish illegal and obscene material. Desmond says the top-shelf magazines and television channels he owned for decades were instead in the legitimate "adult material" category distributed in high-street shops and on Sky UK. Desmond has spent years having his Wikipedia page edited in a failed attempt to remove any suggestion that he is a "pornographer", preferring the term "philanthropist".

See also
 List of litigation involving the Electronic Frontier Foundation
 Theodore Katsanevas
 Wikipedia:Libel

References

External links 
 
 
 
 Wikimedia Foundation, Inc. v. WordLogic Corporation et al on the Free Law Project.

WikiMedia Foundation
Wikimedia Foundation litigation